Lakan Institute ( – Anstītūt Kenūlzhī Lākān) is a village and institute in Lakan Rural District, in the Central District of Rasht County, Gilan Province, Iran. At the 2006 census, its population was 52, in 12 families.

References 

Populated places in Rasht County